I Am Waiting may refer to:

I Am Waiting (film) (俺は待ってるぜ Ore wa matteru ze), 1957 Japanese film directed by Koreyoshi Kurahara
"I Am Waiting" (song), song written by  Rolling Stones from 1966 album Aftermath
"I Am Waiting", song by Ollabelle from Ollabelle (album)
"I Am Waiting", song by Cassandra Wilson from Point of View (Cassandra Wilson album)
"I Am Waiting", song and 12" single by Vigil (band) 1986
"I Am Waiting", song by jazz pianist Stanley Cowell Live at Maybeck Recital Hall, Volume Five, recorded in 1990
"I Am Waiting", song by Mihailo Živanović
"I Am Waiting", song by Jimmy Hotz
"I Am Waiting", song written Rabin, Anderson from List of Yes concert tours (1980s–90s)